Alupei is a Romanian surname. Notable people with the surname include:

Angela Alupei (born 1972), Romanian rower
Dorin Alupei (born 1973), Romanian rower
Francesca Alupei (born 2003), Romanian volleyball player

Romanian-language surnames